Hautefage is a commune in the Corrèze department in central France.

Geography
The Maronne river forms all of the commune's southeastern boundary.

Population

See also
Communes of the Corrèze department

References

Communes of Corrèze